Cicero Leak is an American talent agent.  He is the Co-Founder of TLS Talent Agency and TLS Sports which provides representation for clients in motion pictures, television, literary rights, brand strategy, interactive media, comedy, commercials, personal appearances and professional sports.

Early life and education 
He grew up in Durham, North Carolina where he attended Hillside High School.  After high school, Leak attended North Carolina Central University.

Career 
In 2009 Leak started TLS Talent Agency with long time friend Tristian Turner.  The pair started out with just three clients but quickly grew their client list in 2010 by signing Grammy Award Winning singer Fantasia Barrino, Academy Award nominee director James Fargo, entrepreneur and star of ABC's Shark Tank Daymond John, hip-hop duo/actors Kid N Play, BET Network host Big Tigger, MTV Network host Sway Calloway.

Leak was named one the Honorees of the 2014 North Carolina Central University 40 under 40 Alumni Award.

Leak was named one of Black Enterprise Magazine BE Modern Man Honorees in 2018.

Leak was acknowledged by Diverse Representation as one of the Top Ten Professionals in sports and entertainment to watch in 2021.

Leak along with TLS Co-Founder Tristian Turner and Managing Director Chuck Stinson launched a new sports division, TLS Sports in 2021. The new division will represent professional athletes, coaches, on-air personalities and help athletes from Historically Black Colleges and Universities (HBCU's) that aspire to make to the next level.

References

External links 

 
 Cicero Leak Prepares To Guide Athletes at HBCU'S To The Professional Level

Year of birth missing (living people)
Living people
American talent agents
African-American businesspeople
Businesspeople from Durham, North Carolina
21st-century African-American people